The Revillagigedo barnacle blenny (Acanthemblemaria mangognatha) or Revillagigedo barnacle, is a species of chaenopsid blenny endemic to the Revillagigedo Islands of Mexico, in the eastern central Pacific ocean. It can reach a maximum length of  SL.

References

mangognatha
Fish of Mexican Pacific coast
Revillagigedo barnacle